Long Distance is a compilation album of seventeen of Scottish Celtic rock band Runrig's songs.

Track listing
 "(Stepping down the) Glory Road" - 3:25
 "Alba" ("Scotland") - 4:00
 "The Greatest Flame" - 4:25
 "Rocket to the Moon" - 4:45
 "Abhainn an t-Sluaigh" ("The Crowded River") - 5:20
 "Protect and Survive" - 3:37
 "Rhythm of My Heart" - 4:42
 "Hearthammer" - 3:59
 "An Ubhal as Àirde" (The Highest Apple) - 3:47
 "Wonderful" - 3:55
 "The Mighty Atlantic / Mara Theme" - 6:43
 "Flower of the West" - 6:44
 "Every River" - 4:03
 "Sìol Ghoraidh" ("The Genealogy of Goraidh") - 5:21
 "Hearts of Olden Glory" - 2:16
 "Skye" - 5:07
 "Loch Lomond" - 6:11

Bonus CD
 "Saints of the Soil" 5:03
 "Ravenscraig" - 4:33
 "Solus na Madainn" - 3:38
 "Chi Mi'n Geamhradh" - 4:18
 "The Apple Came Down" - 3:21
 "Chi Mi'n Tir" - 3:28
 "Ribhinn o" - 5:39

Runrig albums
1996 compilation albums
Scottish Gaelic music